A biphasic disease is a disease which has two distinct phases or components. In clinically biphasic diseases, the phases are generally chronologically separated. In histopathologically biphasic tumors (also called biplastic tumors), there is neoplastic tissue which contains two different cellular elements.

Examples

Clinically biphasic diseases

Tumor biplasia

References 

Diseases and disorders